Wenyingia is a genus of proturans in the family Acerentomidae.

Species
 Wenyingia kurosawai (Imadaté, 1986)

References

Protura